The northern Marquesan reed warbler (Acrocephalus percernis) is a species of Old World warbler in the family Acrocephalidae.  It was formerly considered conspecific with the southern Marquesan reed warbler, and together known as the Marquesan reed warbler.

It is found on the northern Marquesas Islands.

Subspecies are listed as follows:
 Eiao Marquesan warbler, Acrocephalus mendanae aquilonis
 Hatutu Marquesan warbler, Acrocephalus mendanae postremus
 Nukuhiva Marquesan warbler, Acrocephalus mendanae percernis
 Uahuka Marquesan warbler, Acrocephalus mendanae idae

References

northern Marquesan reed warbler
Birds of the Marquesas Islands
northern Marquesan reed warbler
Taxa named by Alexander Wetmore
Endemic birds of French Polynesia